Paulo Roberto Falcão, or simply Falcão (born 16 October 1953), is a Brazilian former footballer and football manager. He is the current sporting coordinator of Santos. He is universally considered one of the greatest Brazilian players of all time, especially at his peak in the 1980s.

Falcão is widely considered one of the best players in Internacional and Roma history, playing also for São Paulo. At one stage, he was the world's highest paid footballer.

Due to his success and performances with Roma, Falcão earned the nickname "the eighth King of Rome" from the fans, like Amedeo Amadei before him, and was inducted into the club's Hall of Fame in 2013.

For the Brazil national team, Falcão was capped 34 times between February 1976 and June 1986. He appeared at the 1982 FIFA World Cup, playing in midfield alongside Zico, Sócrates and Éder, considered one of the greatest Brazilian national teams ever. He was named by Pelé one of the 125 Greatest Living Footballers at a FIFA Awards ceremony in 2004. Radamel Falcao's father was a footballer and football fan and named him after Falcão.

Club career

Internacional
Falcão began his professional career at Internacional of Porto Alegre, in Rio Grande do Sul, where he played from 1972 to 1980, winning three Brazilian National Championships (1975, 1976, 1979) and reaching the finals of the 1980 Copa Libertadores, eventually losing to Nacional. During his time at Internacional, he was surprisingly left out of the Brazil squad for the 1978 World Cup in Argentina, though he made the shortlisted pre-tournament 40.

Roma
In 1980, Falcão transferred to Serie A club Roma for £650,000. In his first season in Italy (1980–81), he was able to master the language and had his mother and sister living with him to help settle him in. He played well, scoring 3 goals in his 25 games as Roma finished second in Serie A to Juventus. This was a controversial championship, as Roma had a goal ruled out for an unclear offside against Juventus during a defining draw in Turin. Consolation came with a Coppa Italia win for Roma, beating Torino in the final on penalties – Falcão himself scored the decisive spot kick.

Although Roma slipped to 3rd in his second season (1981–82), personally for Falcão it was better than the first, with 6 goals in 24 games, becoming one of the foreign stars in Serie A. At the end of this season, he was called up for the 1982 World Cup finals in Spain.

After the World Cup, Falcão inspired Roma to win their second league title during the 1982–83 season, scoring 7 times in 27 games, and creating numerous others. Although Juventus's Michel Platini finished as top scorer in the league, and despite Juventus beating Roma in both league games, he was acknowledged as the star man in Serie A that season, also performing well as Roma reached the quarter finals of the UEFA Cup. At the end of this season, Falcão had earned the nickname "the 8th King of Rome".

In 1983–84 Juventus side won the title from Roma who finished second, but it was only won on the final day of the season. Falcão scored 5 goals in his 27 games. Roma's main goal this season, however, was the European Cup, especially as the final was to be played at Roma's own Olympic Stadium. He played every game as Roma swept past IFK Gothenburg, CSKA Sofia and SC Dynamo Berlin to reach the semi-finals against Dundee United.

In a previous Serie A game, Falcão injured his knee, so missed the first leg of the semi-final, as Roma lost 2–0 in Dundee. He returned for the second leg as Roma won 3–0 to reach the final, but again injured his knee in the process. He was fit enough for the final against Liverpool, but played poorly as Roma were eventually defeated on penalties after a 1–1 draw, with Falcão declining to even take a spot kick. This was a marked turning point in his relationship with the club, and the beginning of the end of his time in Rome. Roma again won the Coppa Italia, but despite nearly winning the treble, the mood around the city was not a happy one.

In season 1984–85, Falcão was more famous for his off field antics than his on field ones. Due to his knee troubles, he only managed four games and one goal in the league as Roma slumped to an 8th place in the championship. Falcão then flew off to New York City for an operation on his knee that was unauthorized by the club's doctors, and Roma subsequently terminated his contract. He went back to Brazil after five years in Rome.

São Paulo
Falcão then signed a contract with São Paulo.

While playing for São Paulo, Falcão won two titles. The first was a Campeonato Paulista in 1985 beating Portuguesa in the final with an aggregate score of 5–2, and the second one a Taça dos Campeões Rio-São, also in 1985, where he scored his one and only goal for the club in the second leg against Fluminense.

Falcão retired from professional football after the 1986 World Cup. He is one of eleven members to have been inducted into the A.S. Roma Hall of Fame.

International career
Falcão starred in the midfield of the Brazil 1982 team, along with Toninho Cerezo, Zico, Eder and Socrates, generally seen as one of the best teams not to win the World Cup. He started all the games, as Brazil beat Soviet Union 2–1, scoring the last goal as Brazil then beat Scotland 4–1, and with another goal in the 4–0 win against New Zealand.

In the 2nd phase of the World Cup, his team obtained a 3–1 win against the World Champions Argentina, meaning that the Brazilians needed only a draw in their next game against Italy to advance to the semi-finals. In this  game, despite twice equalising, Brazil were beaten by a Paolo Rossi hat trick as Italy won 3–2. Falcão got the second equalising goal for Brazil against his adopted country with a  drive from the edge of the area. After the match, he was said to be so distressed that he wanted to give up football.

After muddling through a nondescript season for his club (although he helped to win the São Paulo State Championship in 1985), he managed to get a call up to the Brazil 1986 World Cup squad, mainly on reputation.

During this World Cup, he only managed to play in two games (coming on as substitute against both Spain and Algeria). Brazil exited in the quarter finals against the French team of his old rival Michel Platini. After this World Cup, Falcão retired from football.

Coaching career
From 1990 to 1991 Falcão was the manager of the Brazil national team. His second and longest coaching experience was with América from 1991 to 1993. He also coached Internacional in 1993. After a brief hiatus, in 1994, he was the manager of the Japan national team. In April 2011, after 16 years without managing a club, he was signed by Internacional, replacing Celso Roth. He was then sacked in July following three consecutive defeats in the Brazilian league.

In February 2012, Falcão returned into management, signing an 11-month deal as head coach of Bahia. He only returned to coaching duties in September 2015, being appointed manager at Sport.

Falcão returned to Internacional in July 2016, but was sacked after three losses and two draws, only one month later.

Style of play
An elegant and technically gifted player, with an eye for goal from midfield, and an ability to orchestrate his team's attacking moves, Falcão usually functioned as a deep-lying playmaker, although he was capable of aiding his team defensively, as well as creatively and offensively, due to his physique, work-rate, and tenacity. He was known in particular for his flair, control, vision, passing, and long-range shooting ability, as well as his tactical intelligence, organisational ability and leadership. His role has also been likened to that of a metodista ("centre-half," in Italian football jargon), due to his ability to dictate play in midfield as well as assist his team defensively.

Personal life
Falcão was born in Abelardo Luz, in the Southern Brazilian state of Santa Catarina. His father is Portuguese-Brazilian and his mother Azize has Italian origins, from Calabria.

In 2003, Falcão married journalist and TV host Cristina Ranzolin with whom he has a daughter, Antônia, born in 2004.

Media career
Falcão worked for many years as a football commentator for Rede Globo and for its sports oriented branch SporTV.

Career statistics

Club

International

Honours
Internacional
Campeonato Gaúcho: 1973, 1974, 1975, 1976, 1978
Campeonato Brasileiro Série A: 1975, 1976, 1979

Roma
Coppa Italia: 1980–81, 1983–84
Serie A: 1982–83
European Cup: runner-up 1983–84

São Paulo
Campeonato Paulista: 1985
Taça dos Campeões Estaduais Rio-São Paulo: 1985

Individual
Bola de Prata Brazilian Championship All-Star Team: 1975, 1978, 1979
Bola de Ouro Brazilian Footballer of the Year: 1978, 1979
Bronze ball South American Player of the Year: 1979
FIFA World Cup Silver Ball: 1982
FIFA World Cup All-Star Team: 1982
FIFA XI: 1982
Silver ball South American Player of the Year: 1982
Onze de Bronze: 1982
Guerin Sportivo All-Star Team: 1982, 1983
Onze d'Argent: 1983
Guerin Sportivo Player of the Year: 1983
World Soccer's 100 Greatest Footballers of All Time: 1999
FIFA 100: 2004
A.S. Roma Hall of Fame: 2012
Italian Football Hall of Fame: 2016
Brazilian Football Museum Hall of Fame
Golden Foot: 2019, as football legend

References

Bibliography

External links

1953 births
Living people
Sportspeople from Santa Catarina (state)
Brazilian footballers
Brazilian football managers
FIFA 100
Association football midfielders
Olympic footballers of Brazil
Expatriate football managers in Mexico
Expatriate football managers in Japan
Expatriate footballers in Italy
Brazilian expatriate footballers
Brazilian expatriate sportspeople in Italy
Brazil international footballers
Brazilian people of Italian descent
Brazilian expatriate sportspeople in Japan
People of Calabrian descent
1979 Copa América players
1982 FIFA World Cup players
1986 FIFA World Cup players
1991 Copa América managers
Footballers at the 1972 Summer Olympics
Campeonato Brasileiro Série A players
Serie A players
Campeonato Brasileiro Série A managers
Sport Club Internacional players
A.S. Roma players
São Paulo FC players
Brazil national football team managers
Sport Club Internacional managers
Japan national football team managers
Esporte Clube Bahia managers
Sport Club do Recife managers
Santos FC non-playing staff